The 1970 United States Senate election in Texas was held on November 3, 1970. Incumbent Democratic U.S. Senator Ralph Yarborough was defeated by former U.S. Representative Lloyd Bentsen in the Democratic primary. Bentsen then defeated Republican U.S. Representative and future president George H. W. Bush in the general election.  When Bush was running for president in 1988, his Democratic opponent, Massachusetts Governor Michael Dukakis, selected Bentsen as his vice presidential running mate.

Democratic primary

Candidates 
Ralph Yarborough, incumbent U.S. Senator
Lloyd Bentsen, former U.S. Representative

Campaign 
Yarborough, a liberal icon, was challenged by the more conservative Bentsen in the Democratic primary. In what was characterized as an extremely bitter campaign, Bentsen accused Yarborough of supporting desegregation busing and criticized his opposition to the Vietnam War. Many Texas liberals threatened to support the Republican Bush if Bentsen won the primary, believing that the liberal wing of the Texas Democratic Party would be threatened if Bentsen were elected. Bentsen ultimately defeated Yarborough in the Democratic primary on May 2, 1970.

Results

Republican primary 
Bush was unopposed for the Republican nomination.

Candidates 

George H. W. Bush, U.S. Representative, nominee in 1964

General election 
The general election was held November 3, 1970. Bentsen defeated Bush, 53.5% – 46.5%.

Results

References

Texas
1970
George H. W. Bush
1970 Texas elections